Wild Horse is an unincorporated community in Elko County, Nevada, United States. It is located along Nevada State Route 225 just south of Wild Horse Reservoir, from which it derives its name.

References

Unincorporated communities in Nevada
Unincorporated communities in Elko County, Nevada
Elko, Nevada micropolitan area